Gigantometrus swammerdami, commonly called the giant forest scorpion, is a scorpion belonging to the family Scorpionidae. It is native to India.

Description
The body is a uniform reddish brown to reddish black color. Juveniles are typically reddish with a yellow telson. There are 16 to 20 pectinal teeth. Chela strongly lobiform. Manus completely covered by large rounded granulae, but without true carinae. Pedipalp patella lacks a pronounced internal tubercle. Carapace with a smooth disc in which the margins and posterior portion are granulate. Telson bulbous, and the vesicle longer than aculeus.  

The neurosecretions of the species are largely identified.

Ecology
Its venom is not usually lethal to humans because it has arguably evolved to kill its prey by crushing it with its pincers and not by venom. This giant forest scorpion has often been seen around tropical rainforests and other types of moderately warm climates.

Specimens are collected from inside degraded or semi-degraded termite mounds, tree holes and in abandoned rat or crab holes in the bunds of agricultural fields. Males are usually active during the summer season from April to July. Solitary individuals come out of their dens during that period.

References

Scorpionidae
Animals described in 1872
Arachnids of Asia